Ceropales is a genus of kleptoparasitic spider wasps from the sub-family Ceropalinae of the family Pompilidae.  They are characterised by the taking of the spider prey of other solitary wasps, mainly Pompilidae but members of the Sphecidae that provision with spider prey are sometimes also hosts. In some languages their name translates into English as "cuckoo spider wasp".

Species
Species within Ceropales include

Ceropales africana Moczar, 1989
Ceropales albicincta (Rossi, 1790)
Ceropales bipunctata Say, 1824
Ceropales brevicornis Patton, 1879
Ceropales cubensis Cresson, 1865
Ceropales elegans Cresson, 1872
Ceropales femoralis Cresson, 1869
Ceropales fulvipes Cresson, 1872
Ceropales hatoda Brimley, 1928
Ceropales karooensis Arnold, 1937
Ceropales kriechbaumeri Magretti, 1884
Ceropales latifasciatus Arnold, 1937
Ceropales ligea Bingham 1903
Ceropales longipes Smith, 1855
Ceropales longisulcata Lu & Li, 2019
Ceropales maculata (Fabricius) 1775
Ceropales neomexicana Rohwer, 1915
Ceropales nigripes Cresson, 1867
Ceropales pacifica Townes, 1957
Ceropales pictus Shuck, 1837
Ceropales punctulatus Cameron, 1904
Ceropales pygmaeus Kohl, 1879
Ceropales robni Cresson, 1867
Ceropales rugata Townes, 1957
Ceropales scobiniferus Arnold, 1937
Ceropales variegata (Fabricius, 1798)
Ceropales variolosus Arnold, 1937
Ceropales yunnanensis Lu & Li, 2019

References

Hymenoptera genera
Ceropalinae